Daylesford station is a commuter rail station located in the western suburbs of Philadelphia at Glenn Avenue and Lancaster Avenue in Berwyn, Pennsylvania. It is served by most Paoli/Thorndale Line trains.

Description
The Daylesford station has no station building. There is a shelter for eastbound waiting passengers. This station replaced an older wooden shelter built by the Pennsylvania Railroad that was located on Lincoln Highway and Conestoga Lane. It was razed in 2000.

There is no ticket office at this station. There are 152 parking spaces at the station. This station is 18.6 track miles from Philadelphia's Suburban Station. In 2017, the average total weekday boardings at this station was 258, and the average total weekday alightings was 232.

The station is best known to commuters by the iconic station announcement "Dayles-ford" by the SEPTA conductors to signify arrival at the station.  Emphasis is placed on the "Dayles" rolling into "ford" with a soften 'd'.  In 2012, new SEPTA trains implemented a computerized announcement system leaving long time riders of the Paoli/Thorndale line nostalgic for the spirited human voice.

Station layout
Daylesford has two low-level side platforms with pathways connecting the platforms to the inner tracks.

References

External links
SEPTA – Daylesford Station
Old PRR Daylesford Station
 Lancaster Avenue entrance from Google Maps Street View

SEPTA Regional Rail stations
Former Pennsylvania Railroad stations
Philadelphia to Harrisburg Main Line
Railway stations in Chester County, Pennsylvania